The 499th Fighter-Bomber Squadron is an inactive United States Air Force unit.  Its last assignment was with the 85th Fighter-Bomber Group stationed at Waycross Army Airfield, Georgia.   It was inactivated on 1 May 1944.

History
Participated in air-ground maneuvers, October 1942— April 1943, and afterward served as a replacement training unit until 1 May 1944

Lineage
 Constituted as the 305th Bombardment Squadron (Light) on 13 January 1942
 Activated on 10 February 1942
 Redesignated: 305th Bombardment Squadron (Dive) on 27 July 1942
 Redesignated: 499th Fighter-Bomber Squadron on 10 August 1943
 Disbanded on 1 May 1944

Assignments
 85th Bombardment Group (later 85th Fighter-Bomber Group), 10 February 1942 – 1 May 1944

Stations
 Savannah Army Air Base, Georgia, 10 February 1942
 Bowman Field, Kentucky, 16 February 1942
 Hunter Field, Georgia, 9 June 1942
 Waycross Army Air Field, Georgia, 15 August 1942
 Gillespie Field, Tennessee, 3 October 1942
 Blythe Army Air Base, California, 2 November 1942
 Rice Army Air Field, California, 10 December 1942
 Harding Army Air Field, Louisiana, 8 April 1943
 Waycross Army Air Field, Georgia, 22 August 1943
 Harris Neck Army Air Field, Georgia, 20 September 1943
 Waycross Army Air Field, Georgia, 13 December 1943 – 1 May 1944

Aircraft
 Vultee V-72 Vengeance, 1942
 Douglas A-24 Dauntless, 1942–1943
 North American A-36 Apache, 1943
 Bell P-39 Airacobra, 1943–1944
 Curtiss P-40 Warhawk, 1944
 Republic P-47 Thunderbolt, 1944

References

Notes

Bibliography

 
 

Fighter squadrons of the United States Army Air Forces
Military units and formations disestablished in 1944